Sir Ambrose Browne, 1st Baronet (died 1661) was an English politician who sat in the House of Commons of England between 1628 and 1648. He supported the Parliamentary side in the English Civil War.

Browne was the son of Sir Matthew Browne of Betchworth Castle, Surrey, and his wife Jane Vincent, daughter of Sir Thomas Vincent of Stoke d'Abernon. He was educated at Jesus College, Cambridge. He was created a baronet on 7 July 1627.

In 1628 Browne was elected Member of Parliament for Surrey and held the seat until 1629 when King Charles decided to rule without parliament. He was re-elected for Surrey in April 1640 in the Short Parliament, and again in November 1640 for the Long Parliament. He was excluded from parliament in 1648 under Pride's Purge. He was on various commissions for parliament during the Civil War. In 1654 he was visited by the diarist John Evelyn at his home at Betchworth Castle, near the River Mole at Dorking.
 
Browne married Elizabeth Adam, daughter of William Adam of Saffron Waldon. His son Adam succeeded to the baronetcy and was also MP for Surrey.

References

 

1661 deaths
Year of birth missing
Baronets in the Baronetage of England
People from Surrey (before 1889)
Ambrose
Roundheads
English MPs 1628–1629
English MPs 1640 (April)
English MPs 1640–1648